The Maritime Search and Rescue is the Mexican Navy's SAR unit. It is responsible for improving the quality and effectiveness of the Navy's response to Mexico's maritime emergencies. The Mexican Navy historically has been responsible for the search and rescue operations using its available resources. However, aware of the importance of safeguarding human life at sea and the growing demand of sea rescue, the High Command of the Navy established a separate, specialist arm for the task.

Organization and operations

The Mexican Search and Rescue primary missions are SAR operations within 50 miles of the Mexican coast line, to accomplish search and rescue operations in a timely manner, It utilizes 5 current active Naval Stations. There are two types of Search and Rescue Naval Stations (Estaciones Navales de Búsqueda y Rescate, ENSAR). Type A (Alfa) Naval Stations are equipped with one 47-Foot Motor Lifeboat and two 33-foot Defender-class boats. Type B (Bravo) are equipped with  33-foot Defender-class boats. The first Naval Station to be active was opened on April 6, 2007 in Puerto Vallarta, Jalisco. In total the Maritime SAR unit goal is 19 ENSAR stations—six Type As, and 13 Type Bs.

Active ENSAR stations
 Puerto Vallarta ENSAR station (Jalisco)
 Ensenada ENSAR station (Baja California)
 Los Cabos ENSAR station (Baja California Sur)
 Huatulco ENSAR station (Oaxaca)
 Isla Mujeres ENSAR station (Quintana Roo)

Equipment

References

Sea rescue organizations
Mexican Navy